Missouri Baptist Medical Center, known locally as MoBap, is a hospital in Town and Country, Missouri. Its origins were in 1884 when Dr. William H. Mayfield opened his home to patients. In 1886 it opened as the Missouri Baptist Sanitarium.  In 1892, it offered ambulance service via horse and carriage. A Nursing Training School opened in 1895.

As of 2006, the facility had 489 beds and 3000 employees. It is part of BJC HealthCare.

References

Hospital buildings completed in 1886
Hospitals established in 1886
1894 establishments in Missouri
Healthcare in St. Louis County, Missouri
Hospitals in Missouri
Hospitals established in 1894
Buildings and structures in St. Louis County, Missouri